ZDT's Amusement Park is a  family amusement park located in Seguin, Texas. The park first opened in 2007 and has grown to feature 12 attractions, three of which are water rides, along with a video game arcade. It is open year-round with the exception of its water rides which only operate from March through September. The park opened its first roller coaster, Switchback, in 2015.

History 
In March 2007, ZDT's Amusement Park first opened its doors to the public and featured five indoor attractions. Owners Danny and Sarah Donhauser named the park after their three children – Zac, Danielle, and Tiffany – using the first letter of each name. Multi-level go-karts were added in 2008, and Mad Raft Water Coaster, a water coaster that was the park's first water ride, opened in 2011.

In late 2014, ZDT's unveiled plans to build Switchback, a wooden shuttle roller coaster that features a 104-degree overbanked turn and a record-breaking, 87-degree incline. The custom-designed roller coaster opened to the public on October 17, 2015. It navigates through and around various buildings and structures ending in a culminating finale element called the Grand Spike, which sends riders upward an 87-degree incline. Switchback is the first and only wooden shuttle coaster of its kind and derives its name from the 1884 Switchback Railway, considered to have been the first coaster in United States.

The theme of the ride also celebrates the history of the property on which the park is built with its locomotive-themed train cars. The park grounds were once an agricultural and grocery center containing within the block of land everything from grain silos to meat processing. All of the buildings in the park were remodeled from their original purposes instead of being torn down and rebuilt. The Silo Climb, for example, is a climbing wall built on the facade of the silos that once stored the grain of local farmers. The indoor section of the GoKarts runs through the warehouses in which that grain was processed, where one can see hanging above some of the original equipment used for this process. The main building of the park was once a grocery center that would have stored and readied the finished product for sale. The walkway to the water park is built atop the old train tracks which were used to transport that product to other areas, and an original Santa Fe executive train car still sits along this walkway in part to commemorate this history.

Rides and attractions

Switchback
Switchback is a wooden shuttle roller coaster. The ride first opened on October 17, 2015 at ZDT's Amusement Park in Seguin, Texas. The ride is currently the record holder for steepest wooden roller coaster at 87 degrees, as well as the first wooden shuttle coaster.

Other attractions

References

Amusement parks in Texas